Martenstyn's Barb (Systomus martenstyni) is a species of cyprinid fish endemic to Sri Lanka. It is important to local commercial fisheries.

References

Martenstyn's barb
Fish of Sri Lanka
Martenstyn's barb
Taxonomy articles created by Polbot